Hopea pachycarpa is a species of plant in the family Dipterocarpaceae. It is found in Sumatra, Peninsular Malaysia and Borneo.

References

pachycarpa
Trees of Sumatra
Trees of Peninsular Malaysia
Trees of Borneo
Vulnerable plants
Taxonomy articles created by Polbot